Hemmatabad (also Romanized as Hemmatābād) is a village in Deh Bakri Rural District, in the Central District of Bam County, Kerman Province, Iran. At the 2006 census, its population was 57, in 14 families.

References 

Populated places in Bam County